The President of the Chamber of Republic and Provinces was the presiding officer of one of the chambers of that legislature.

Below is an incomplete list of office-holders from 1974:

Sources
Various editions of The Europa World Year Book

Chamber of Republics and Provinces, Pres
Yugoslavia, Chamber of Republics and Provinces